Francesco Greco (9 November 1942 – 1 October 2018), also known as Franco Greco, was an Italian lawyer and politician.

He was elected to the Italian Senate from 1983 to 1994 in the region of Sicily for numerous parties. First he served as a member of the Italian Socialist Party, joining  the Italian Communist Party in January 1987, and finally joining the Democratic Party of the Left in April 1992.

References

1942 births
2018 deaths
20th-century Italian lawyers
People from Syracuse, Sicily
Senators of Legislature IX of Italy
Senators of Legislature X of Italy
Senators of Legislature XI of Italy
Italian Socialist Party politicians
Italian Communist Party politicians
Democratic Party of the Left politicians